Travis Boak (born 1 August 1988) is a professional Australian rules footballer playing for the Port Adelaide Football Club in the Australian Football League (AFL). Boak captained the club from 2013 to 2018, and is the club's AFL games record holder with 327 games. He is also a three-time All-Australian, dual John Cahill Medallist and three-time Showdown Medallist.

AFL career

Boak was selected with 's first selection and fifth overall in the 2006 AFL draft from the Geelong Falcons in the TAC Cup. He made his AFL debut in a 31-point victory in round 12 of the 2007 season against . The following week, against , Boak kicked his first ever AFL goal. In round 19 against , he earned a NAB Rising Star nomination for his 28 possessions and 2 goals. Boak went on to play in the Port Adelaide team which competed in the 2007 AFL Grand Final against , losing by a record margin. At the start of 2008, Boak picked up where he left off, playing a greater role in the Port Adelaide midfield alongside senior players such as Domenic Cassisi, Kane Cornes and Shaun Burgoyne. He played in 17 games and averaged 20.1 disposals. Boak continued to improve in 2009 winning the Gavin Wanganeen Medal and averaging 23.7 disposals for the season.

The 2010 season was Boak's best season to date with a career best average of 23 possessions per game. His season ended with a flourish when he kicked three goals in each of the final two rounds. He became the first-tagged player in the Port Adelaide midfield and finished the season with 16 Brownlow Medal votes. The 2011 season saw Boak play in 21 games and lead the club in disposals (458), clearances (79) and inside 50s (85). He along with Jackson Trengove were jointly crowned the John Cahill Medallist, the first time that there had been a tie at the club's best and fairest award since 1893.

For the 2013 season, Boak was announced as the captain of the club, therefore replacing his number 10 guernsey with number 1, in accordance with Port Adelaide tradition. 2013 was considered to be Boak's best AFL season up to that point, with an average of 25.3 disposals a game, and kicking a season best of 20 goals. He was named in the 2013 All-Australian team. In 2014, Boak continued where he left off from 2013, averaging a career best 26.6 disposals a game and tolling a season best 21 Brownlow votes to finish equal 4th. He was named in the 2014 All-Australian team, his second consecutive selection.

Boak shifted between the midfield and half-forward over the following few seasons. In 2019, after stepping down from the captaincy at the end of the previous season, Boak made a permanent shift back to the midfield, enjoying career-best numbers. Boak would go on to win his second John Cahill Medal after averaging a career-best 30 disposals, before having a shoulder operation in the off-season.

Upon the resumption of the 2020 season after it was curtailed due to the COVID-19 pandemic, Boak gathered 24 disposals and a goal in Port Adelaide's record-breaking 75-point Showdown win in round 2 to win his second Showdown Medal. He went on to have a career-best season, earning selection as vice-captain in the 2020 All-Australian team and finishing second and third respectively in votes for the Leigh Matthews Trophy and AFLCA champion player of the year award. He also finished as runner-up in the 2020 Brownlow Medal with an equal-career-high 21 votes, ten votes behind winner Lachie Neale.

Boak played his 300th match, also against Collingwood, in round 19 of the 2021 season; he recorded 30 disposals as he equalled the club's games record held by Kane Cornes.

Statistics
Updated to the end of the 2022 season.

|-
| 2007 ||  || 10
| 14 || 4 || 3 || 101 || 124 || 225 || 51 || 38 || 0.3 || 0.2 || 7.2 || 8.9 || 16.1 || 3.6 || 2.7 || 0
|-
| 2008 ||  || 10
| 17 || 9 || 4 || 175 || 167 || 342 || 88 || 64 || 0.5 || 0.2 || 10.3 || 9.8 || 20.1 || 5.2 || 3.8 || 2
|-
| 2009 ||  || 10
| 18 || 7 || 5 || 223 || 204 || 427 || 81 || 73 || 0.4 || 0.3 || 12.4 || 11.3 || 23.7 || 4.5 || 4.1 || 5
|-
| 2010 ||  || 10
| 20 || 13 || 12 || 247 || 207 || 454 || 70 || 122 || 0.7 || 0.6 || 12.4 || 10.4 || 22.7 || 3.5 || 6.1 || 16
|-
| 2011 ||  || 10
| 21 || 12 || 6 || 236 || 222 || 458 || 76 || 98 || 0.6 || 0.3 || 11.2 || 10.6 || 21.8 || 3.6 || 4.7 || 4
|-
| 2012 ||  || 10
| 18 || 9 || 11 || 239 || 186 || 425 || 47 || 66 || 0.5 || 0.6 || 13.3 || 10.3 || 23.6 || 2.6 || 3.7 || 6
|-
| 2013 ||  || 1
| 23 || 20 || 13 || 315 || 266 || 581 || 99 || 96 || 0.9 || 0.6 || 13.7 || 11.6 || 25.3 || 4.3 || 4.2 || 13
|-
| 2014 ||  || 1
| 24 || 19 || 6 || 266 || 378 || 644 || 88 || 92 || 0.8 || 0.3 || 11.1 || 15.8 || 26.8 || 3.7 || 3.8 || 21
|-
| 2015 ||  || 1
| 22 || 13 || 14 || 252 || 310 || 562 || 70 || 120 || 0.6 || 0.6 || 11.5 || 14.1 || 25.6 || 3.2 || 5.5 || 16
|-
| 2016 ||  || 1
| 22 || 17 || 10 || 252 || 274 || 526 || 68 || 103 || 0.8 || 0.5 || 11.5 || 12.5 || 23.9 || 3.1 || 4.7 || 7
|-
| 2017 ||  || 1
| 22 || 19 || 13 || 227 || 268 || 495 || 105 || 99 || 0.9 || 0.6 || 10.3 || 12.8 || 22.5 || 4.8 || 4.5 || 10
|-
| 2018 ||  || 1
| 22 || 19 || 13 || 238 || 243 || 481 || 86 || 94 || 0.9 || 0.6 || 10.8 || 11.1 || 21.9 || 3.9 || 4.3 || 2
|-
| 2019 ||  || 10
| 21 || 10 || 13 || 306 || 331 || 637 || 70 || 102 || 0.5 || 0.6 || 14.6 || 15.8 || 30.3 || 3.3 || 4.9 || 16
|-
| 2020 ||  || 10
| 19 || 8 || 8 || 217 || 219 || 436 || 51 || 72 || 0.4 || 0.4 || 11.4 || 11.5 || 22.9 || 2.7 || 3.8 || 21
|-
| 2021 ||  || 10
| 23 || 8 || 18 || 305 || 335 || 640 || 67 || 110 || 0.3 || 0.8 || 13.3 || 14.6 || 27.8 || 2.9 || 4.8 || 25
|-
| 2022 ||  || 10
| 21 || 10 || 10 || 250 || 312 || 562 || 86 || 85 || 0.5 || 0.5 || 11.9 || 14.9 || 26.8 || 4.1 || 4.0 || 10
|- class=sortbottom
! colspan=3 | Career
! 327 !! 197 !! 159 !! 3849 !! 4046 !! 7895 !! 1202 !! 1437 !! 0.6 !! 0.5 !! 11.8 !! 12.4 !! 24.1 !! 3.7 !! 4.4 !! 174
|}

Notes

Honours and achievements

Team
 McClelland Trophy: 2020

Individual
 Port Adelaide captain: 2013–2018
 Port Adelaide AFL games record holder
 3× All-Australian team: 2013, 2014, 2020
 2× John Cahill Medal: 2011, 2019
 2× Australia representative honours in international rules football: 2014, 2017
 Victoria representative honours in State of Origin for Bushfire Relief Match
 3× Showdown Medal: 2013 (game 1), 2020, 2021 (game 1)
 3× Peter Badcoe VC Medal: 2014, 2015, 2019
 AFL Rising Star nominee: 2007

References

External links

 
 

1988 births
Living people
Port Adelaide Football Club players
Port Adelaide Football Club players (all competitions)
Australian rules footballers from Victoria (Australia)
Glenelg Football Club players
Geelong Falcons players
John Cahill Medal winners
All-Australians (AFL)
Australia international rules football team players